In Greek Mythology, Phaeax was a son of Poseidon and Korkyra (Cercyra), from whom the Phaeacians derived their name. He was the father of Alcinous and Locrus.

Mythology 
When Phaeax, who reigned in the island of Scheria, died, Alkinous and Lokros after quarreling came together again on the basis that Alkinous would be king of Phaiakis, and Lokros would take the heirlooms and part of the ethnos to make a colony.

Notes

References 

 Conon, Fifty Narrations, surviving as one-paragraph summaries in the Bibliotheca (Library) of Photius, Patriarch of Constantinople translated from the Greek by Brady Kiesling. Online version at the Topos Text Project.
 Diodorus Siculus, The Library of History translated by Charles Henry Oldfather. Twelve volumes. Loeb Classical Library. Cambridge, Massachusetts: Harvard University Press; London: William Heinemann, Ltd. 1989. Vol. 3. Books 4.59–8. Online version at Bill Thayer's Web Site
 Diodorus Siculus, Bibliotheca Historica. Vol 1-2. Immanel Bekker. Ludwig Dindorf. Friedrich Vogel. in aedibus B. G. Teubneri. Leipzig. 1888-1890. Greek text available at the Perseus Digital Library.
 Stephanus of Byzantium, Stephani Byzantii Ethnicorum quae supersunt, edited by August Meineike (1790-1870), published 1849. A few entries from this important ancient handbook of place names have been translated by Brady Kiesling. Online version at the Topos Text Project.

Children of Poseidon
Demigods in classical mythology
Phaeacians in Greek mythology